Job 3 is the third chapter of the Book of Job in the Hebrew Bible or the Old Testament of the Christian Bible. The book is anonymous; most scholars believe it was written around the 6th century BCE. This chapter belongs to the Dialogue section of the book, comprising Job 3:1–31:40.

Text
The original text is written in Hebrew language. This chapter is divided into 26 verses.

Textual witnesses
Some early manuscripts containing the text of this chapter in Hebrew are of the Masoretic Text, which includes the Aleppo Codex (10th century), and Codex Leningradensis (1008). 

There is also a translation into Koine Greek known as the Septuagint, made in the last few centuries BC; some extant ancient manuscripts of this version include Codex Vaticanus (B; B; 4th century), Codex Sinaiticus (S; BHK: S; 4th century), and Codex Alexandrinus (A; A; 5th century).

Analysis
The structure of the book is as follows:
The Prologue (chapters 1–2)
The Dialogue (chapters 3–31)
The Verdicts (32:1–42:6)
The Epilogue (42:7–17)

Within the structure, chapter 3 is grouped into the Dialogue section with the following outline:
Job's Self-Curse and Self-Lament (3:1–26)
Job's Self-Curse (3:1–10)
Job's Self-Lament (3:11–26)
Round One (4:1–14:22)
Round Two (15:1–21:34) 
Round Three (22:1–27:23)
Interlude – A Poem on Wisdom (28:1–28)
Job's Summing Up (29:1–31:40)

The Dialogue section is composed in the format of poetry with distinctive syntax and grammar.

Job curses his day of birth (3:1–10)
After the prose prologue in chapters 1–2, the narrator of the Book of Job fades away until reappearing in chapter 42, so there is no interpreter to explain the conversation among the individual speakers and the readers have to attentively follow the threads of the dialogue. When seven days had passed since the arrival of Job's three friends, Job finally released his 'pent-up emotions', by cursing the day of his birth (verses 2–10), before turning to questioning in verses 11–26. In all of his words, Job did not directly curse God as the Adversary had predicted (1:11) or his wife had suggested (2:9). Nothing in Job's "self-curse" or "self-imprecation" is inconsistent with his faith in God, Job's words are best understood as a bitter cry of pain or protest out of an existential dilemma, preserving faith in the midst of an experience of disorientation, rather than an incantation to destroy the creation, because of the inability of literal fulfillment.
[[File:Léon Bonnat - Job.jpg|right|thumb|150px|"'Job by Léon Bonnat (1880)]]
This is the only curse that Job uttered, although throughout the book, he gets desperately close to cursing God (the goal expected by the Adversary in Job 2:5), but until the end he never did.
The Syriac version (Peshitta) reads “the day on which he was born.”

Verse 4
The subject of this verb is the hapax legomenon term , neharah, “light”, that is derived from the verb , nahar, “to gleam” (cf. Isaiah 60:5).

Job's Self-Lament (3:11–26)
Job's lament in this section has two discrete parts:
Job expresses the wish that he had never been born, proceeding immediately from womb to the netherworld (3:11–19)
Job turns to the misery of his present life (3:20–26)

The lament complements Job's initial cry (verses 1–10) with a series of rhetorical questions: posing an argument that because he was born (verse 10), the earliest chance he had of escaping this life of misery would have been to be still born (verses 11–12, 16), whereas in verses 13–19 Job regards death as 'falling into a peaceful sleep in a place where there is no trouble'. YHWH later poses His questions to Job (Job 38–41) that made Job realize that Job had been ignorant of the ways of the Lord.

Verse 11
[Job said:] Why did I not die at birth,come out from the womb and expire?"''

The two halves of the verse use the prepositional phrases ("at birth", literally "from the womb", and "come out from the womb", literally, "from the belly I went out"), both in the temporal sense of “on emerging from the womb."

The 'twin images of death' in two halves of the verse ("die", "expire") contrast the 'two symbols of life' in verse 12 ("knees to receive me", "breasts to nurse").

See also

Related Bible parts: Genesis 1, Job 1, Job 2, Jeremiah 20

References

Sources

External links
 Jewish translations:
 Iyov - Job - Chapter 3 (Judaica Press) translation [with Rashi's commentary] at Chabad.org
 Christian translations:
 Online Bible at GospelHall.org (ESV, KJV, Darby, American Standard Version, Bible in Basic English)
 Book of Job Chapter 3 King James Version
  Various versions

03